Rebore, vol. 3 is the third remix album of material by experimental noise rock band Boredoms. It is the third of four in the Rebore series, and is a DJ remix by DJ Krush that contains samples from Boredoms' entire discography to that point.

Track listing
"DJ Krush Gigamix" – 44:51

Personnel
DJ Krush – production, compilation, mixing
Toshihiko Miyoshi – engineering, mixing
Mitsukazu Tanaka – mastering
Ausgang – artwork
Masanobu Kondo – executive production
Noriko Asano – production coordination

References

Boredoms albums
2001 remix albums
Warner Music Group remix albums